Mik'aya (Aymara for abyss in the water, also spelled Mikhaya) is a  mountain in the Cordillera Real in the Andes of Bolivia. It is located in the La Paz Department at the border of the Pedro Domingo Murillo Province, La Paz Municipality, and the Sud Yungas Province, Yanacachi Municipality. Mik'aya lies north-east of the city of La Paz, south-east of the mountains Ch'uñawi and Wak'ani and north of the mountains Jathi Qullu and Sirk'i Qullu.

Mik'aya lake and stream 


Mik'aya is also the name of a small nearby lake and the name of a stream west of the mountain. The stream flows to the west along the lake Qhunqhu Wiqara (Kunco Huikara) and then to the south-west.

See also
 Chacaltaya
 Inkachaka Dam
 Sirk'i Quta
 List of mountains in the Andes

References 

Mountains of La Paz Department (Bolivia)
Lakes of La Paz Department (Bolivia)